Hemed Khamis (died 28 March 2013) was a Tanzanian politician, who was MP for Pemba Island.

Death
Khamis died of a stroke on 28 March 2013.

References

2013 deaths
Tanzanian politicians
Year of birth missing